Vallampadugai Srinivasa Raghavan Arunachalam is an Indian scientist.  He is the founder and chairman of CSTEP, a science and technology think tank.

Education
Arunachalam holds bachelor's and master's degrees in science and received his PhD degree in materials science and engineering from the University of Wales, UK in 1965 and an alumnus of Sharada Vilas College Mysuru.

Career
Arunachalam worked as a scientist at the Bhabha Atomic Research Centre, National Aeronautical Laboratory in Bangalore, and Defence Metallurgical Research Laboratory in Hyderabad. He was the head of DRDO for about ten years in the 1980s.  During his tenure the budget of DRDO increased eightfold, and he is credited with being able to get over both bureaucratic and financial hurdles. He initiated major defence projects like the Light Combat Aircraft and the Integrated Guided Missiles programmes.

Arunachalam served as defence scientific advisor to the defence minister of India between 1982 and 1992, serving ten defence ministers and five prime ministers, and as secretary, Department of Defence Research for Government of India. He advised the government on the definition, assessment and review of a number of major technological and societal programs such as optical fiber communications for India, development of indigenous iron and steel technologies, scientific and technological missions for the country to eradicate illiteracy, infant mortality etc.  He also advised the government in the area of graduate education in engineering.

Arunachalam is collaborating professor, engineering and public policy at the Carnegie Mellon University.  He is also an honorary professor at the UK's University of Warwick.  He is a former member of the Defence Research & Development Service (DRDS).

Awards
He has received numerous awards and medals, including the Shanti Swarup Bhatnagar Prize for Science and Technology in Engineering Science in 1980. He was the first Indian to be  elected as a Fellow of the Royal Academy of Engineering, UK.
He was conferred Padma Bhushan (1985) and Padma Vibhushan (1990) for his contribution to Indian science. In 2015, he was awarded Defence Research and Development Organisation's (DRDO's) lifetime achievement award for his outstanding contribution in the field of scientific research and technology.

References

Living people
1935 births
Scientists from Bangalore
Indian aerospace engineers
Fellows of the Indian National Science Academy
Recipients of the Padma Bhushan in civil service
Recipients of the Padma Vibhushan in literature & education
Tamil scientists
Fellows of the Indian Academy of Sciences
Fellows of the Royal Academy of Engineering
20th-century Indian engineers
Indian materials scientists
Recipients of the Shanti Swarup Bhatnagar Award in Engineering Science